Ruslana is a Slavic female given name. Ruslana is a feminine form of the name Ruslan. Notable people with the name include:
 Ruslana, Ukrainian singer and winner of the Eurovision Song Contest 2004
 Ruslana Korshunova (1987–2008), Russian model
 Ruslana Kyrychenko (born 1975), Ukrainian basketball player
 Ruslana Pysanka (1965–2022), Ukrainian actress and cinematographer
 Ruslana Taran (born 1970), Ukrainian sailor
 Ruslana Tsykhotska (born 1986), Ukrainian athlete

Russian feminine given names
Ukrainian feminine given names
Bulgarian feminine given names
Serbian feminine given names
Slovene feminine given names
Croatian feminine given names
Macedonian feminine given names